Don Donovan (23 December 1929 – 26 September 2013) was an Irish professional football player and manager.

Career
He was a right back who played for Everton F.C. and Grimsby Town. Donovan joined Everton in 1951 from junior football in Ireland and went on to play 187 times for The Toffees scoring just twice. In August 1958, he was transferred to Grimsby Town for a fee of £5,000 where he played until 1964 before becoming player manager of Boston United. He was a huge success at Boston, winning League titles in each of his three seasons with the club.

At international level, he represented Republic of Ireland five times at senior level making his debut in November 1954 

His son Terry Donovan was also a professional footballer who went on to play for the Republic of Ireland, and his granddaughter is Keeley Donovan, the weather presenter.

Death
Donovan died on 26 September 2013.

References

External links
Don Donovan, Post War English & Scottish Football League A - Z Player's Transfer Database
Profile on Boston United site

1929 births
2013 deaths
Sportspeople from Cork (city)
Republic of Ireland association footballers
Republic of Ireland international footballers
Everton F.C. players
Grimsby Town F.C. players
Boston United F.C. players
English Football League players
Republic of Ireland football managers
Boston United F.C. managers
Association football fullbacks